The Cambridge Companion to Shakespeare's Poetry is a nonfiction book edited by Patrick Cheney. It was published in 2007 by Cambridge University Press.

Overview
This book consists of a collection of fourteen essays and an introduction surveying the cultural climate and surroundings of Shakespeare's day.

References

External links

Book description. Penn State. 

Literary criticism
Literary theory
2007 non-fiction books
Shakespearean scholarship
Cambridge University Press books